James Adkisson (born January 11, 1980) is a former American football tight end in the National Football League.  He spent the 2007 NFL season on the practice squads of the Kansas City Chiefs and Green Bay Packers, having been cut by the Oakland Raiders.  In 2006, Adkisson played in two games for the Raiders and had one catch for nine yards.

External links
 South Carolina Gamecocks bio
 Transactions for Adkisson

1980 births
American football tight ends
Living people
Oakland Raiders players
South Carolina Gamecocks football players
Cologne Centurions (NFL Europe) players
Kemper Military School alumni